Michael Paul Mooney (May 31, 1969 – March 2, 2007) was a National Football League player for the San Diego Chargers and the Houston Oilers. Mooney, who played collegiately at Georgia Tech and appeared in one game for the Chargers as an offensive tackle.

External links

1969 births
2007 deaths
American football offensive tackles
Georgia Tech Yellow Jackets football players
San Diego Chargers players
Houston Oilers players
People from Westminster, California
Players of American football from Baltimore